Seven Queens (Sindhi:ست سورميون, pronunciation (sat-a soor-myoon); meaning Seven heroic women) is a name commonly referred to the seven female characters that appear in the poetry of the  Sindhi poet Shah Abdul Latif Bhittai in his book Shah Jo Risalo. They are:
Marui (مارئي)
Moomal (مومل)
Sasui (سسئي)
Noori (نوري)
Suhni (سوہنی)
Lilan (ليلا)
Sorath (سورٹھ).
These seven  female characters, which the poet picked from history to convey his poetic message, have remained cultural icons in the history of Sindh for their bravery, passion, loyalty, commitment, and character strength.

Marui's character portrays the love for the land, its people, her commitment to her traditions, her stance before a tyrant king, Umar (عمر) or as some say (Amar—امر). Moomal's character portrays an image of a passionate soul, brimming with love for her beloved, Rano (راڻو) and suffers at the altar of separation and rejection but does not surrender. Sasui is a daunting lady, who takes a debilitating journey of mountainous tracks to find her beloved, Punhoon (پنهون). Noori is a fisher-woman who enchants the king Tamachi (تماچي) and turns out to be one of the most romantic characters in Sindhi literature like Moomal and Suhni. Sohni is a daring soul, who, in order to meet her beloved Mehar (ميهار) overlooks the hyper waves of the Indus River and keeps meeting her beloved on the far bank of the river and one night falls victim to the river waves and dies. Lilan loses her king (husband) Chanesar for an obscenely expensive necklace and undergoes travails of an unbearable separation to regain her status and character; while Sorath is a loving soul, full of passion and care about her beloved.

Shah Abdul Latif had structured his poetry book, Ganj, commonly known as Shah Jo Risalo, in a form that suggested he intended to convey his message to the world through his verse. Among many intentions behind his poetry, one of his major inclinations was towards highlighting the marginalized populace of the country, especially women. Accordingly, he chose these Seven women or  Seven  Queens of the Sindhi folktales as protagonists in his stories. These tragic romantic tales are Umar Marvi,Momal Rano, Sohni Mehar, Lilan Chanesar, Noori Jam Tamachi, Sassui Punhun and Sorath Rai Diyach.

These heroic women have a considerable influence on all the literature written in Pakistan (Sindhi, Urdu, Balochi, Pashto, Siraiki, Punjabi) and particularly Sindhi literature in India, Moomal and Suhni being the prominent ones. From the texts of these folktales, and especially Latif's poetry, the role of these very women would appear to dominate the role of men as their counterparts. In Umar-Marvi, if only Latif's poetry is analyzed, less space is dedicated to Umar's role, most of the story/narration refers to difficulties Marvi undergoes as a result of her abduction by the King Umar in the south-eastern part of Sindh. In Moomal-Rano, Moomal's role overwhelms everything else including Rano's character. Sasui-Punhoon is predominantly the story of Sasui's struggle to find her beloved husband who left her, apparently, for good. Only a little chunk is dedicated to Punhoon in this story. Noori-Jam Tamachi is predominantly the romantic tale from Noori's context. Tamachi is just like a source to help substantiate Noori's perspective. Suhni-Mehar is again the story of Suhni's anxiety and trouble she takes to meet Mehar. Mehar is not more than a figment of image. In Lilan-Chanesar, again the supposed protagonist is Lilan. However, in Sorath-Rai Diyach, Sorath, unlike the characters in the aforementioned tales, dominates the story in the spirit, not the material (space given to her in the text).

Thus, the story of each of these Eight Heroic Women, little or more, one or the other way, relates to the cultural milieu and substance of the evolutionary process of the peoples living in the regions of old India and current Pakistan. Lubna Jehangir painted all seven queens of Shah Abdul lateef and displayed them at the Ocean art gallery under guidance of Attiya Dawood

References 

Sindhi folklore
Culture of Sindh
Pakistani folklore